The Philippine Institute of Sports Complex (also known as the PhilSports Complex) is a  national sports complex of the Philippines. It is located in Meralco Avenue in Pasig, Metro Manila, Philippines. It is where the offices of the Philippine Sports Commission, Philippine Olympic Committee and some national sports associations are located.

PhilSports Complex facilities are purposely built to cater the Filipino athletes’ needs from training facilities to living quarters. By virtue of Republic Act 6847, which created the Philippines Sports Commission, was to develop and maintain a fully equipped sports facility. Due to its proximity to business districts of Makati and Ortigas, the arena is also used in concerts and conventions.

History

20th century

1970s
The complex was actually the sports field of a defunct school named Saint Martin's Integrated School (Elementary and High School). The school was transferred by First Lady Imelda Marcos during the 1970s and the school was reorganized as the University of Life, a vocational school.

1980–1999
In 1985, the Philippine Basketball Association became main tenants of the PhilSports Arena after nine years at the Araneta Coliseum. The venue attracted standing-room only crowds during their stay. The PBA stayed for seven years until they moved to the newly built Cuneta Astrodome in 1993, citing the venue's lack of maintenance.

After the Marcos family was removed from the country during the 1986 People Power Revolution, the University of Life was closed. However, the sports complex was transferred to the Philippine Sports Commission in preparation for the 1991 Southeast Asian Games. Several names were applied at the complex. These were The ULTRA, PSC-National Academy of Sports (PSC-NAS) and PSC Sports Complex. Due to confusion to the public especially in concerts, the commission decided to adopt a permanent name, PhilSports.

21st century

2000s
The sports complex reached its maximum audience space when the Asian pop group F4 and Taiwanese local star Barbie Hsu staged a concert in the facility in September 2003. It was one of the venues of the 2005 Southeast Asian Games which was held from November 27, 2005, to December 5, 2005. It hosted the games' badminton event.

PhilSports stampede

On February 4, 2006, the PhilSports Complex became the site of a deadly stampede that killed 74 people and injured hundreds. Wowowee, the now-defunct early afternoon game show of television network ABS-CBN, was scheduled to hold its first anniversary show at the complex. Attracted by the large prizes given out during the show, crowds of people, mostly from the lower classes of society, waited for days just outside the stadium. As the opening of the gates neared a few hours before the show, the crowd surged forward crushing those at the front of the queue underfoot.

The cause of the stampede is still being determined pending investigation.

2010s

There was a plan by the Philippine Sports Commission to put up of a beach volleyball court inside the track and field oval of the PhilSports Football and Athletics Stadium, a proposal opposed by the Philippine Athletics Track and Field Association (PATAFA). PATAFA President, and Philippine Super Liga Chairman Philip Ella Juico said that the construction of the sand court may hamper the athletics national team's preparations.

The complex underwent a major renovation, prior to its hosting of some events of the 2019 Southeast Asian Games.

2020s
In 2020, the Philippine Sports Commission plans to relaunch its Philippine Sports Library, which will be hosted inside the complex's Building A. The planned library will have at least 3,000 books.

Facilities

Sports venues

See also
 Rizal Memorial Sports Complex
 New Clark City Sports Hub
 PhilSports Stadium stampede

References

Sports venues in Metro Manila
Buildings and structures in Pasig
1985 establishments in the Philippines
Sports venues completed in 1985
Sports complexes in the Philippines